Carabanchel Alto is a station on Line 11 of the Madrid Metro. It is located in fare Zone A.

References 

Line 11 (Madrid Metro) stations
Railway stations in Spain opened in 2006
Buildings and structures in Carabanchel District, Madrid